Selâhattin Âdil (January 19, 1882; Constantinople (Istanbul) – February 27, 1961; Istanbul) was an officer of the Ottoman Army and a general of the Turkish Army.

Works
 Selahattin Adil (ed. Enver Koray), Hayat Mücadeleleri- Selahattin Adil Paşa'nın Hatıraları, Zafer Matbaası, 1982.

See also
List of high-ranking commanders of the Turkish War of Independence

Sources

External links

1882 births
1961 deaths
Military personnel from Istanbul
Democrat Party (Turkey, 1946–1961) politicians
20th-century Turkish politicians
Deputies of Ankara
Governors of Adana
Ottoman Army officers
Turkish Army generals
Ottoman military personnel of the Italo-Turkish War
Ottoman military personnel of the Balkan Wars
Ottoman military personnel of World War I
Turkish military personnel of the Turkish War of Independence
Ottoman Imperial School of Military Engineering alumni
Ottoman Military College alumni
Recipients of the Medal of Independence with Red Ribbon (Turkey)
Burials at Turkish State Cemetery